Unit 180(180부대) is a North Korean cyberwarfare cell, a component of the Reconnaissance General Bureau.

Kim Heung-kwang, a former computer science professor in North Korea, stated that Unit 180 is likely involved in illicit operations to obtain cash for the regime, such as a counterattack on Bangladesh Bank and the WannaCry ransomware attack.

References

Information operations units and formations
Reconnaissance General Bureau
Cyberwarfare